Russell Dean Filter Sr. is an American college baseball coach and former catcher and pitcher. Filter is the head coach of the Santa Clara Broncos baseball team.

Playing career
Filter attended Mission Bay Senior High School in San Diego, California. Upon graduation from high school, Filter enrolled at San Diego State University. Filter began his college career as a catcher, but found his calling as a pitcher for the Aztecs as a sophomore. Filter made 80 appearances and recorded 10 saves in his career. Filter was selected by the Toronto Blue Jays in the 1990 Major League Baseball draft. Filter played the 1990 season with the St. Catharines Blue Jays, where he appeared in 19 games recording a 4.50 ERA and 2 saves.

Coaching career
Filter left the professional ranks following his stint in rookie ball, and became an assistant coach at San Diego State. He left the Aztecs after one season to become an assistant at Mission Bay High School. After two seasons at Mission Bay, Filter returned to San Diego State. Filter spend 16 seasons at SDSU and helped produce Stephen Strasburg as the first overall pick in the 2009 Major League Baseball draft.

Filter moved on to be the pitching coach for the Stanford Cardinal in 2010. Filter stayed with the Cardinal for the duration of Mark Marquess tenure with the Cardinal, and interviewed to be his replacement, but when Stanford chose David Esquer, Filter pursued other options.

On June 23, 2017, Filter was named the new head coach of the Santa Clara Broncos baseball program.

Head coaching record

See also
 List of current NCAA Division I baseball coaches

References

External links

San Diego State Aztecs bio
Stanford Cardinal bio
Santa Clara Broncos bio

Living people
1968 births
Baseball catchers
Baseball pitchers
San Diego State Aztecs baseball players
St. Catharines Blue Jays players
San Diego State Aztecs baseball coaches
High school baseball coaches in the United States
Stanford Cardinal baseball coaches
Santa Clara Broncos baseball coaches